Front Cover is a 2015 American drama romance film written and directed by Ray Yeung. The story follows Ryan Fu, a gay Chinese American fashion stylist (Jake Choi), who rejects his ethnic heritage, who is assigned to style Ning (James Chen), an ostensibly heterosexual patriotic actor from Beijing. Front Cover received mostly positive critical reception and received awards from festivals such as San Diego Outfest, Boston Asian American Film Festival, and Outflix Film Festival.

Plot 
Front Cover tells the story of Ryan Fu, a gay Chinese American who rejects his Asian heritage and has learned to suppress it to climb up the social ladder. Through talent and hard work he attains his dream job as an assistant to Francesca, a celebrity fashion stylist. One day Francesca assigns Ryan to style Ning, an actor who has just arrived from Beijing, for a top magazine photo shoot. Ning dismisses Ryan's initial Western styling and demands Ryan create an image for him that represents the power of the new China. Their opinions clash, resulting in a strained working relationship.

Over the following days, they socialize while working together and discover not only do they have a lot in common, a mutual attraction begins to develop. As they get closer, Ryan reveals that he detests his Chinese heritage because he is ashamed of his impoverished upbringing. Ning also opens up and confesses that he is closeted. As they fall in love, a Chinese tabloid magazine exposes Ning as gay. Terrified of the impact it will have on his career, Ning begs Ryan to lie for him at a press conference. Ryan must now decide whether to help Ning or stay true to himself.

Cast 
 Jake Choi as Ryan Fu
James Chen as Qi Xiao Ning
 Elizabeth Sung as Yen Fu
Jennifer Neala Page as Janet
 Sonia Villani as Francesca
Li Jun Li as Miao
Ming Lee as Ba
Benjamin Thys as James
Tom Ligon as Gus LaMar

Release 
Front Cover premiered in 2015 at the Seattle International Film Festival.

Strand Releasing and Edko Films Ltd. acquired USA and Hong Kong distribution rights. It was released in the US in August 2016 and in Hong Kong in October 2016.

Reception 
Front Cover holds an 82% approval rating on Rotten Tomatoes. Godfrey Cheshire of RogerEbert.com described it as, "A skillfully written and acted gay love story about two young men of Chinese ancestry...The transition from distrust to wary friendship to something more passionate in a movie like this depends a lot on the writing, and Yeung’s is subtle and assured, tracing an emotional arc that’s believably nuanced." Robyn Bahr of the Village Voice described it as a "sexy, ambitious queer rom-com(ish) drama." Jeannette Catsoulis reviewed the movie for the New York Times, calling it "sensitive, decorous and buffed by Eun-ah Lee’s warm photography."

Accolades

Awards 

Best Screenplay, FilmOut San Diego Film Festival, 2016
 Jury Award Best Domestic Feature, Outflix Film Festival Memphis, 2016
 Audience Award for Best Narrative Film, Boston Asian American Film Festival, 2016
 Best Full Feature, Serile Filmului Gay International Film Festival Romania, 2016
 Best Actor (James Chen), Australia Golden Koala Chinese Film Festival, 2017

Nominations 

 New American Cinema Award, Seattle International Film Festival, 2015
 Q Hugo Award, Chicago International Film Festival, 2015
 Best Director, Australia Golden Koala Chinese Film Festival, 2017
 Best Film,Australia Golden Koala Chinese Film Festival, 2017

References

External links
 
 
 

2015 films
2015 LGBT-related films
LGBT-related drama films
Gay-related films
2010s English-language films
Films about Chinese Americans
Asian-American LGBT-related films
Asian-American drama films
2015 drama films
2010s American films